State Route 41 (abbreviated SR 41) is part of Maine's system of numbered highways, located in the central part of the state.

Route description
SR 41 begins in Winthrop along with SR 133 at an interchange with US 202 and SR 11/SR 100. The two routes run concurrent for  before they split apart not far north from Winthrop. SR 41 runs west of Maranacook Lake until it joins with SR 17 in Readfield.  later, SR 41 splits north also in Readfield. From the split SR 17 and SR 41 northward to Vienna, SR 41 comes close to eight lakes, but only crosses a small river connecting Echo Lake to Taylor Pond. SR 41 passes through Vienna and then enters Franklin County. SR 41 passes through the extreme southwestern corner of New Sharon near Crowell Pond and meets the southern terminus of SR 134 before entering Chesterville.  Continuing north, SR 41 meets the eastern terminus of SR 156 just before crossing into Farmington, and ends shortly thereafter at the intersection with Farmington Falls Road (US 2/SR 27).

Major intersections

References

External links

Floodgap Roadgap's RoadsAroundME: Maine State Route 41

041
Transportation in Franklin County, Maine
Transportation in Kennebec County, Maine